Carl Schultz (born 1939) is a Hungarian-Australian film director.

Carl Schultz may also refer to:

 Carl Heinrich 'Bipontinus' Schultz (1805–1867), German botanist
 Carl Heinrich 'Schultzenstein' Schultz (1798–1871), German botanist

See also
Karl Schultz (born 1937), German equestrian
Karl L. Schultz, Commandant of the United States Coast Guard
Carl Schulz (disambiguation)
Karl Schulze (disambiguation)
 Schultz